The 2022–23 Second Men's League of Serbia is the 17th season of the Second Basketball League of Serbia, the 2nd-tier men's professional basketball league in Serbia.

Teams
A total of 16 teams participated in the 2022–23 Second Men's League of Serbia, divided into two geographical groups with 8 clubs. On 1 July 2022, the Basketball Federation of Serbia confirmed the teams for the 2022–23 season, with a note given to Radnik.

Promotion and relegation 

The following are the team changes of Second League from the 2021–22 season:

Venues and locations 
Source

Head coaches

Regular season

Group A

Group B

See also
 2022–23 Basketball League of Serbia

References

External links
 Official website of Second Basketball League
 League Standings at eurobasket.com
 League Standings at srbijasport.net

Second Basketball League of Serbia
Serbia
Basketball